Glyphipterix okui is a species of sedge moth in the genus Glyphipterix. It was described by Alexey Diakonoff in 1976. It is found in Japan (Honshu).

The wingspan is 9–12 mm.

References

Moths described in 1976
Glyphipterigidae
Moths of Japan